Varhaug Station is a railway station located at Varhaug in Hå, Norway on the Sørlandet Line. The station is served by the Jæren Commuter Rail between Stavanger and Egersund. Prior to 1907, the name was spelled Varhoug.

References

External links
 Jernbaneverket Varhaug profile 

Railway stations on the Sørlandet Line
Railway stations in Hå
Railway stations opened in 1878
Varhaug
1878 establishments in Norway